Haefeli Moser Steiger (HMS) was a Swiss architectural firm,  founded by the architects Max Ernst Haefeli, Werner Max Moser and Rudolf Steiger, the office existed from 1937 to 1975 and was one of the most important Swiss architectural firms of the 20th century. In 2007, the Museum für Gestaltung dedicated an exhibition to the office under the title Chair House City - Haefeli Moser Steiger.

Buildings
 Werkbundsiedlung Neubühl, Zurich, 1930-1932
 Kongresshaus Zürich, Zurich, 1936-1939
 University Hospital of Zurich, Zurich, 1941-1953
 Wohnkolonie Farbhof, Zurich, ca. 1950
 Verwaltungsgebäude der Eternit AG, Niederurnen, 1953–55
 Hochhaus zur Palme, Zurich, 1955-1964
Zur Palme, Zurich, 1961

References

Literature
 Sonja Hildebrand, Bruno Maurer, Werner Oechslin (Hrsg.): Haefeli Moser Steiger. Die Architekten der Schweizer Moderne, 

Architecture firms of Switzerland
Defunct companies of Switzerland
Design companies established in 1937
Companies based in Zürich
Design companies disestablished in 1975
Swiss companies established in 1937
1975 disestablishments in Switzerland